Deemer is a surname. Notable people with the surname include:

Audrey Deemer (1930–2012), American baseball player
Elias Deemer (1838–1918), American politician
Horace E. Deemer (1858–1917), American judge

See also
 Demmer